1981
Soviet
Films